Acleris hyemana is a moth of the family Tortricidae. It is found in Europe.

The ground colour is purple-brown contrasting with the silvery-white markings.

Adults are on wing from August to May.  There is one generation per year.

The larvae feed on Ericaceae species, mainly Erica, Calluna vulgaris and Vaccinium.

References

hyemana
Tortricidae of Europe
Moths described in 1811